Saint Irchard{{efn|William Mackay explained that Merchard is Mo Erhard, signifying my Erhard. The old Celts of Ireland and Scotland had a habit of placing the pronoun mo (my) before the names of their favorite saints as a term of affection... The name Erchard is in ancient writings variously written:– Erchard, Erchad, Erchan, Erthadus, Erchard, Erchadus. }} (or Erchard, Erthad, Merchard, Yarcard, Yrchard) was a Scottish missionary and bishop.

Barrett's account

According to Dom Michael Barrett (1848-1924), a monk of the Order of Saint Benedict at St. Benedict's Abbey, Fort Augustus, Scotland, in his The Calendar of Scottish Saints (1919),

Butler's account

The hagiographer Alban Butler mentions the bishop briefly in his The Lives of the Primitive Fathers, Martyrs, and Other Principal Saints,

Mackay's account
The local historian William Mackay (1848–1928) wrote in his Urquhart and Glenmoriston: Olden Times in a Highland Parish'' (1893),

Notes

Citations

Sources

 
 
 

Medieval Scottish saints